Zaouia el Kbira (also written Zaouia el Kebira or Zaouia Kebira) is a village in the commune of Kerzaz, in Béchar Province, Algeria. It lies on the Oued Saoura between Béni Ikhlef and Kerzaz.

References

Neighbouring towns and cities

Populated places in Béchar Province